Clarence was an American animated television series created by Skyler Page for Cartoon Network. The series revolves around the title character and his two best friends, Jeff and Sumo. The creator of the series, Skyler Page, a former storyboard artist for Adventure Time and revisionist for Secret Mountain Fort Awesome, developed the series at Cartoon Network Studios as part of their shorts development program in 2012.

The pilot aired after the 2014 Hall of Game Awards show on February 17, 2014. The series officially premiered on April 14, 2014, and was seen by approximately 2.3 million viewers, outperforming shows in its same demographic in the time slot. The series' pilot was nominated for a Creative Arts Emmy Award. The series completed its four-year run on June 24, 2018, after three seasons and 130 episodes.

Premise
The series focuses on the daily life of Clarence Wendle, a fun-loving and spirited 10-year-old boy, and his best friends: Jeff, who is the more intellectual type, and Sumo, who often uses drastic measures when solving problems.

Clarence lives with his divorced mother Mary and her boyfriend Chad in the fictional town of Aberdale, Arizona. Each episode focuses on the daily-life situations and problems that Clarence and his friends encounter, and their everyday adventures and life experiences as kids.

Other characters include students and faculty at Aberdale Elementary, Clarence's school. Certain episodes focus on the life of supporting characters, like the citizens of Aberdale and Clarence's classmates.

Characters

Main characters

Clarence Wendle (voiced by Skyler Page and Spencer Rothbell) – An extroverted, optimistic, and wide-eyed 10-year-old boy who wants to bring out the best in everything and everyone. In the pilot episode, he was the "new kid" in Aberdale and could not wait to make friends. He more often than not listens to and follows his heart, reacting toward life with unfailing excitement and enthusiasm. A "nice guy" at heart, Clarence aspires to help people, especially his fellow kids, have fun and live freely, often by using unorthodox methods to do so. He can, however, occasionally let his imagination get the better of him, and has a bad habit of meddling into people's personal lives, unintentionally making their troubles worse. Clarence has a wide range of interests and hobbies, and despite sometimes coming off as a goofball, he more often than not displays an underlying intelligence. Nick Pitera provides Clarence's singing voice in "Jeff Wins"
Jeffrey "Jeff" Randell (voiced by Sean Giambrone) – Clarence's 10-year-old best friend who is intelligent, levelheaded, and morally inclined of the trio and tries his best to prevent Clarence from going down a bad road. Jeff's most well-known trait is that he has a cube-shaped head which represents his "square" personality. He is an avid fan of game shows and enjoys playing along with them.
Ryan "Sumo" Sumouski (voiced by Tom Kenny) – Clarence's 10-year-old best friend, who is fearless, unpredictable, and often takes drastic and crude measures when trying to solve problems. Despite this often being a drawback, Sumo is loyal to Jeff and Clarence and available when they need support. He and Jeff tend to quarrel with each other due to their opposing personalities, but Clarence acts as the glue that holds the boys' friendships together. In the third season, Sumo was transferred to the new school called West Aberdale. Jason Marsden voiced Sumo in the pilot. 
Mary Wendle (voiced by Katie Crown) – Clarence's 37-year-old mother who is always there to support her son no matter the difficulty. She lives with her boyfriend Chad and her son Clarence. It is revealed In "Hurricane Dilliss" she has an overbearing mother which makes her very annoyed by her taking over her life, and that she has been seeing a therapist for 15 years.
Charles "Chad" Caswell (voiced by Eric Edelstein) – Mary's 36-year-old husband who works at various odd-jobs and acts as Clarence's father figure (Although Clarence mostly calls him Chad). Also has a fondness for guitar playing and rock music that is shown in the pilot.

Aberdale Elementary students
 Belson Noles (voiced by Roger Craig Smith) – An 11-year-old bully who is more likely to use insults, quips, and pranks rather than physical violence. Selfish, inconsiderate, spoiled, obese, lazy, a show-off, no respect to his teachers or mother and very superficial, Belson is very unpopular among his peers because of this, yet Clarence is the only one that likes him, though the same can't be said for him. Belson is also prone to envy, as he is aggravated by the fact that Clarence is the "popular kid" at Aberdale Elementary School and has occasionally tried to ruin his reputation. He is also named after Nelson Boles, who helped create the series. He likely takes after his father, who appears in "Company Man" because they both show a desire for complete control over others. The same voice actor who played Sumo in the pilot, Jason Marsden, voiced Belson as well.
 Crendle Candle (voiced by Miles Brown) – A boy who attends Aberdale school and is 5 years old. Crendle is the youngest in the whole school, and he is incredibly quiet. 
Chelsea Keezheekoni (voiced by Grace Kaufman) – A plucky and outspoken 11-year-old girl who insists that she is superior to any boy, mainly Sumo. She and Sumo have shared a kiss in Clarence, Jeff and Sumo's treehouse in "Too Gross for Comfort".
Ashley (voiced by Mckenna Grace) – A 10-year-old girl who was once the girlfriend of Clarence, but they have since ended their relationship, though they remain friends, she likes looking for frogs and attending art class. she has a ponytail, a pink shirt, and blue overalls.
Debbie – A 10–11 year old who wears a bright pink shirt, yellow hair, and a green skirt. She was named in the school going away book.
Amy Gillis (voiced by Ava Acres) – A nice, 11-year-old girl who is a good friend to Clarence. However, she never appears after her debut in the second episode, "Pretty Great Day With a Girl", due to her moving away, save for a cameo in "Rough Riders Elementary" and a flashback in "Clarence For President". She has an older brother.
Amy Shutzger (voiced by Skyler Page and Damien Haas) – A big girl who, along with Mavis, is the only recurring female character to be voiced by a man. She wears her hair in a ponytail and is taller than most of her classmates. She has a crush on Jeff.
Nathan (voiced by Skyler Page and Damien Haas) – One of Belson's friends. He's a big 12-year-old boy who is considered dim-witted and has been held back 2 years. He becomes friends with Clarence as well, often participating in his escapades.
Dustin Conway (voiced by Kyle Arem) – An 11-year-old karate aficionado who is one of Clarence's classmates and Belson's friends. He later becomes friends with Clarence.
 Rita Lord (voiced by Maddy McGraw) – A playful skateboarding 10-year-old who gave clarence a helmet and knee and elbow pads, she is friends with Chelsea and loves skateboarding her whole life away.
 Percy Dahmer (voiced by Roger Craig Smith) – A short, wimpy, 10-year-old boy who speaks in a weak voice and is friends with Clarence and Belson. He lacks fingers. Like Clarence, he tends to let his imagination get the better of him.
Breehn (voiced by Joshua Rush) – A 10-year-old overachiever who is more of Jeff's friend than Clarence's, and keeps himself well grounded at all times. However, in later episodes he warms up to Clarence and joins him on some of his misadventures. He becomes a better friend of Clarence, and lets loose when with him.
 Camden (voiced by Spencer Rothbell) – A boy who has deflating cheeks, he has a dad named Sherly who has deflating cheeks as well. He enjoys camping.
 Kimby (voiced by Isabella Niems) – Another of Clarence's classmates. Kimby is shown as an introverted, awkward, insecure, yet lovely 10-year-old girl who constantly makes her hair long but not succeeded just yet. As a girly girl, Kimby often collects dolls and stuffed animals, enjoys giving and receiving makeovers, and listens to boy bands. Jeff considers her as an enemy as she was wearing a disguise. It is shown that she was once friends with Clarence along with Malessica and Courtlin in episode "Slumber Party". She wears a blue full skirt with a white bit in the center.
 Malessica (voiced by Ivy Bishop) – a 9-10 year old. One of Kimby's friends who is the object of Jeff's affection. She is in love with Jeff, and considered to be a little bit cute. She plays the electric guitar, as revealed in "Turtle Hats".
 Courtlin (voiced by Tayler Buck) – A 12 year old girl, another of Kimby's friends. She has a confident personality and isn't afraid to speak her mind.
Reed (voiced by Bryson Barretto) – A boy who has glasses and has a black skin.
Vu (voiced by Grace Kaufman) – A black-haired, skinny boy who speaks in a loud, exclaiming voice. He has a brother, as revealed in "Chadsgiving".
 Tinia (voiced by Mckenna Grace) – An 8-year-old girl whom Clarence meets at the hospital. She presents as sweet and naïve, but has a greedy and selfish soul.
 Regis Gilben – A silent and motionless 12-year-old boy who communicates with an eerie wind sound instead of a voice. Everyone can seemingly understand this; also, somehow he is ghost-like and can touch without moving.
 Guyler (voiced by Skyler Page snd Spencer Rothbell) – A blond-haired boy with a long neck and a big nose. Although generally silent, he does make occasional grunts. He is friends with Clarence, and joins him on his escapades. At first a minor character, he becomes more prominent in later episodes; specifically in "A Nightmare on Aberdale Street: Balance's Revenge", it is shown that he is Dutch.
 Mavis (voiced by Spencer Rothbell) – A squat, noseless, red-haired, 10-year-old girl who speaks in unintelligible grunts and has a fear of fire hydrants.
 Brady Brown (voiced by Daniel DiMaggio) – A shy, quiet, self-isolating student who has a crush on Mavis. He is also handy and intelligent.

Aberdale Elementary staff
Ms. Melanie Baker (voiced by Katie Crown) – The 32-year-old 5th grade teacher at Aberdale Elementary who is shown to be helpful and caring, yet easily overwhelmed.
Mr. Jim Reese (voiced by Skyler Page and Donovan Patton) – The gruff yet dim-witted, 55-year-old vice-principal of the school. He is a former police officer with a voracious appetite.
Ms. Brenda Shoop (voiced by Katie Crown) – The inattentive, irresponsible, possibly 56-year-old guidance counselor who cares less about the students and more about the rules, safety and herself. She has been working at the school for 49 years, as revealed in "The Substitute", but in " Lost Playground" her mother stated that she wasn't allowed to play on the playground 30 years prior.
Ms. Meg Julep (voiced by Kate Berlant) – A substitute teacher who is extremely nervous and gullible and is unable to control the students.

Sumouski family
Mel Sumouski (voiced by John DiMaggio) – Sumo's strict father, a 45-year-old hillbilly who is extremely rough around the edges and has a tough personality, but is very understanding with his kids.
Tinona Sumouski (voiced by Christine Lakin) – Sumo's extremely protective mother who speaks with a southern accent.
Braidy Sumouski (voiced by Mckenna Grace) – is Sumo's cherish, good, confident 8-year-old sister who gave Clarence a wrench to fight the armadillos, she loves looking through the aquarium and being a mermaid, she has a Scottish-like hillbilly like accent. Although Sumo and Braidy don't get along together, Braidy also loves watching wrestling and is generally quiet. She wears a pink skirt, a pink shirt, and a pink bow on her head.
Tanner Sumouski (voiced by Ari Rubin) – Sumo's muscular, dim-witted, 21-year-old older brother who frequently bullies Sumo.

Noles family
Cynthia Noles (voiced by Mena Suvari) – Belson's kind mother who doesn't stand up to anyone and doesn't notice her son's mean behavior, until she sees how he acts to Clarence in the episode "Dust Buddies" and punishes him by not only making him do the chores he called their maid to do because of his laziness, but also ruining his game save files and avatars. She resembles him down to their noses. Jeff is implied to have a crush on her.
Mr. Noles (voiced by Rick Zieff) – Belson's greedy, workaholic father who never spends any time with his son, to the point that he doesn't recognize the boy. He has a very aggressive and violent personality.

Randell family
EJ and Sue Randell (voiced by Lea DeLaria and Tig Notaro respectively) – Jeff's lesbian mothers who are free-spirited and always patient with their son.
Rosie Randell (voiced by June Squibb) – EJ's mother and Jeff's grandmother. She is extremely overbearing.

Extended Wendle family
Dilliss Wendle (voiced by Maria Bamford) – Mary's fast-talking, scatterbrained, extremely selfish, overbearing, 68-year-old mother who suffers from dementia and insists that she do everything for everyone. In "Plane Excited", she is revealed to have died, although it's never specified how. 
Seymour Wendle (voiced by Jeff Bennett) – Mary's father. He calls Clarence "Creedence", implying that he may be suffering from dementia just like his wife.
Fern and Star Caswell (voiced by Eric Edelstein and Cree Summer respectively) — Chad's calm, laid-back hippie parents who live in a dome-shaped house and have pet emus.

Extended Shoop family
Millie Shoop (voiced by Katie Crown) – Ms. Shoop's extremely protective mother who would never let her play outside as a child. She very much resembles an elderly version of her daughter.

West Aberdale Elementary staff
Mr. Craig Mozer (voiced by Carlos Alazraqui) – Sumo's relaxed teacher at West Aberdale Elementary who is involved with Ms. Baker.
Ms. Lofton (voiced by Jenelle Lynn Randall) – The principal of West Aberdale Elementary.

Breehn's family
Walt and Tiffany (voiced by Dave Wittenberg and Abigail Revasch respectively) – Breehn's parents who are emotionally abusive towards their son and believe themselves to be superior to everyone around them. They constantly brag about their home.

Others
Joshua "Josh" Maverick (voiced by Brent Popolizio) – A grumpy 27-year-old man who doesn't like children, especially Sumo, and later Clarence. He is shown to be very accident prone and constantly gets severe injuries during every one of his appearances, usually accidentally caused by Clarence's hijinks.
Sandy (voiced by Katie Crown) – A stuffy, unsatisfiable, rude, irritable, morbidly obese woman who rides around on a scooter and speaks with an upper-class English accent. She is a frequent customer at Mary's hair parlor, where she often runs over employees and always demands that the most expensive shampoo be used for her.
Larry (voiced by Skyler Page and Spencer Rothbell) — An odd 70-year-old man who goes on a date with Ms. Baker in "Neighborhood Grill". He is known for not being fazed by anything.
Cooter and Seabass (voiced by Gunnar Sizemore and Atticus Shaffer respectively) — A pair of 13-year-old bullies who are rivals of Sumo's.
Lauren (voiced by Rachel Eggleston) – An extremely smart girl who has been homeschooled since she was 6 years old and doesn't know much about the outside world.
Lauren's Dad (voiced by Jeff Witzke) – Lauren's dignified yet gentle and open-minded hippie father who encourages Lauren to talk about her feelings.
Jeremy (voiced by Henry Kaufman) – Clarence's zany doppelgänger who appears in his dreams, which he tries to trap Clarence in.
Balance (voiced by Spencer Rothbell) – A violent, short-tempered circus performer with dwarfism who loves to terrorize children and has a hook for a right hand. He is very acrobatic and possesses mind control powers.
The Mayor of Aberdale (voiced by Dave Boat) – The selfish, idiotic, and corrupt mayor.
Marianio (voiced by John DiMaggio) – The town's pizza chef who is beloved by all. He may be insane, seeing as he dresses up as Jeff to badmouth himself as a prank.

Production
At their 2013 upfront, Clarence was announced along with various other series.
The series was created by Page, a former storyboard artist for Adventure Time and revisionist for Secret Mountain Fort Awesome.
He is the fourth creator on the network who graduated from the California Institute of the Arts, and at age 24, he is also the youngest.
As part of their shorts development program in 2012, the series was developed at Cartoon Network Studios; four others, Steven Universe, Over the Garden Wall, We Bare Bears and Long Live the Royals also came from this initiative.

Page, together with creative director Nelson Boles, conceived the series at CalArts. It was further considered when Page became hired at Cartoon Network Studios. A crew of two or three polished the pilot episode; after it had been picked up, a crew of 30 to 35 writers, storyboard artists, revisionists, colorists and designers were employed. Meanwhile, animation is outsourced to South Korea through the Saerom Animation. Page explained that the hardest part of production was keeping pace, especially where once an episode is completed, one must start over. He called this "exciting", but "very challenging".

According to writer Spencer Rothbell, the series was created with a naturalistic tone, similar to cartoons of the 1990s, combined with a more modern feeling. Given this naturalism, writers can reference works that have inspired for them or fit the genre of an episode. He ultimately felt that it was about "empowering kids and having fun". Rothbell also avoids "pigeonholing" into one type of story, and that while some plots are mostly character-driven, others are "based on one idea that we think is really funny". Inspiration also came from the shows Page watched as a child, which invoked more poignant and relatable situations. Despite this, elements of fantasy are allowed, and that conveying both incongruous to one another was one technique he particularly enjoyed. Boles noted that the art direction called for inconsistent character design to avoid having to fit model sheet with the universe perfectly—a result of what he dubs The Simpsons effect. Attention is also paid to background characters in order to expand variety in its plot and universe.

Crossover
In the end of the Steven Universe/Uncle Grandpa crossover episode, "Say Uncle", UG looks over the list of characters from former and current Cartoon Network shows and saw Clarence is the last on his list.

Clarence, Jeff, Sumo, and Belson appeared in "The Grampies", the short accompanying the Uncle Grandpa episode "Pizza Eve", along with other Cartoon Network characters from currently running and ended cartoons. Belson had a speaking role in that short.

In The Amazing World of Gumball episode "The Boredom", Clarence and Mary make an appearance, alongside Uncle Grandpa and Regular Show characters.

In the OK K.O.! Let's Be Heroes episode "Crossover Nexus", Jeff made an appearance, along with other Cartoon Network characters.

Sexual assault allegations against Page and firing
In July 2014, Skyler Page was fired from Cartoon Network Studios amid allegations that he had sexually assaulted a female coworker. A Cartoon Network spokesperson confirmed that the series would continue despite his absence. Spencer Rothbell later became head of story and the voice of Clarence. Nelson Boles, who was previously the series creative director, served as series showrunner for the remainder of the first season. Stephen P. Neary, one of the storyboard artists for the series, took over as showrunner for the second season and onward after Boles left the series early in the second season.

LGBT representation

In September 2014, Spencer Rothbell, a writer, head of storywriting, and voice actor of multiple characters for Clarence, said that they had to change a scene in the episode "Neighborhood Grill", which showed two gay characters after pushback from Cartoon Network executives. According to Rothbell, the original scene showed the two characters kissing on the lips, noting that "originally the guy had flowers and they kissed on the mouth." Later he lamented that the scene in the episode is "better than nothing", adding that "maybe one day the main character can be gay and it won't be a big deal." Despite this step back, there were some moves forward.

On December 4, 2014, EJ Randell and Sue Randell were introduced as Jeff's mothers in the episode "Jeff Wins".

Cancellation
On April 4, 2017, Spencer Rothbell confirmed on his Twitter page that the series' third season would be its last as Cartoon Network did not renew the series for a fourth season, which ended on June 24, 2018.

Episodes

Broadcast and reception

Clarence was originally previewed at the 2013 San Diego Comic-Con International.
Cartoon Network had commissioned twelve quarter-hour episodes, with the pilot episode airing after the Hall of Game Awards show on February 17, 2014.
The pilot was nominated for an "Outstanding Short-format Animated Program" at the 65th Primetime Creative Arts Emmy Awards in 2013.
The first episode, broadcast April 14, 2014, was met with an estimated 2.3 million viewers, outperforming shows in its same demographic in the time slot by double and triple-digit percentages.
Meanwhile, preliminary data identified it as the most watched series premiere for the network that year.
From September 7 to September 30, 2020, reruns of the series aired on Boomerang.

In Canada, Clarence premiered on Cartoon Network on April 14 and on Teletoon on September 4, but it was later moved exclusively to Cartoon Network. The series premiered on October 6 on Cartoon Network in Australia and New Zealand and on November 3 on Cartoon Network in the United Kingdom and Ireland. In India, the series debuted on June 1, 2015 on Cartoon Network. The last 13 episodes of the series aired first in Germany before airing in the United States.

In a three-star review, Emily Ashby of Common Sense Media alerted parents of "a similar brand of absurdity and crudeness" as Adventure Time—though less severe—but praised the cast as "oddly likable".
Nancy Basile of About.com applauded the dialogue for its lengthiness, and considered the relationships between the characters to be dynamic and genuine, with some comedy thrown in. Whitney Matheson of USA Today found Clarence to blend optimism and surreal humor in "just the right amount", and encouraged children and parents alike to watch its premiere.
In Animation Magazine, Mercedes Milligan described it as "a breath of fresh suburban air" and a celebration of childhood.
Nivea Serrao of TV Guide contrasted the show with most fantasy animated series.
Brian Lowry of Variety called it "so quirky and idiosyncratic as to feel fresh", although it sometimes tread in "well-worn territory", but found the character designs unattractive.

The series gained considerable press after featuring a gay couple in the episode "Neighborhood Grill", with coverage in various tabloid and entertainment news sites, and in LGBT-oriented sites as well.
The scene involves two male characters greeting each other with kisses on the cheek while at a restaurant.
Rothbell originally had the couple kiss on the lips after receiving flowers from the other, but this went unapproved by the network.
He added that the scene was a "minor throwaway moment", albeit "better than nothing", and anticipated that "one day the main character can be gay and it won't be a big deal".
Joe Morgan of Gay Star News called the buildup to the scene "an old joke", a notion shared by Dan Tracer of Queerty, although he praised their portrayal "just as normal people".

In 2017, the Kenya Film Classification Board banned Clarence, together with the cartoon series The Loud House, The Legend of Korra, Hey Arnold!, Steven Universe and Adventure Time, from being broadcast in Kenya. According to the Board, the reason was that these series were "glorifying homosexual behavior".

Awards and nominations

Home media

The series was made available on HBO Max on May 27, 2020. It was later removed from the streaming service on December 6, 2022 in the US; it was later brought back on the service on December 20.

Notes

References

External links
 
 
 

2010s American animated television series
2010s American children's comedy television series
2010s American LGBT-related animated television series
2010s American LGBT-related comedy television series
2010s American school television series
2014 American television series debuts
2018 American television series endings
American children's animated adventure television series
American children's animated comedy television series
Cartoon Network original programming
Television series by Cartoon Network Studios
Cartoon Network franchises
English-language television shows
Elementary school television series
Animated television series about children
Television shows set in Arizona